Gerrit Abrahamszoon de Vries (22 February 1818 – 4 March 1900) was a Dutch jurist and politician who served as Prime Minister of the Netherlands from 4 June 1872 to 27 August 1874. He took office after his predecessor died (Thorbecke).

References
Biography in Elsevier, 21 April 2009 (in Dutch).

1818 births
1900 deaths
Prime Ministers of the Netherlands
Ministers of Justice of the Netherlands
Dutch jurists
Dutch Mennonites
Politicians from Haarlem
Leiden University alumni